Griseargiolestes fontanus is a species of Australian damselfly in the family Megapodagrionidae,
commonly known as a springs flatwing. 
It is endemic to south-eastern Queensland and north-eastern New South Wales, where it inhabits streams near their springs.

Griseargiolestes fontanus is a medium-sized damselfly, black-green metallic in colour with pale markings; adults have only a slight pruinescence.
Like other members of the family Megapodagrionidae, it rests with its wings outspread.

Griseargiolestes fontanus appears similar to Griseargiolestes albescens, though with less pruinescence.

Gallery

See also
 List of Odonata species of Australia

References 

Megapodagrionidae
Odonata of Australia
Insects of Australia
Endemic fauna of Australia
Taxa named by Robert John Tillyard
Insects described in 1913
Damselflies